Benavach (also Romanized as Benāvach and Banāwach; also known as Banāvaj and Benāvaj) is a village in Badr Rural District, in the Central District of Ravansar County, Kermanshah Province, Iran. At the 2021census, its population was 80, in 24families.

References 

Populated places in Ravansar County